Greta Marianne Ljung (born 1941) is a Finnish American statistician. The Ljung–Box test for time series data is named after her and her graduate school advisor, George E. P. Box. She has written textbooks on time series analysis and her work has been published in several top statistical journals, including Biometrika and the Journal of the Royal Statistical Society.

Biography
Ljung received her bachelor's degree in psychology from Åbo Akademi University in Finland. During this time, she developed an interest in psychometrics. After graduation, she studied at the University of Uppsala for eight months under the direction of statistician Herman Wold.

She received her M.S. and Ph.D. in Statistics at the University of Wisconsin–Madison in 1976. Her dissertation was on time series analysis. She held a faculty position at the University of Denver after graduation, where she continued to publish work with her advisor George E. P. Box. In 1978, they published their paper on the Ljung-Box test, which was a modification to the Box-Pierce test.

She taught statistics at the Massachusetts Institute of Technology for over ten years. She has also held a faculty position at Boston University.

She currently resides in Lexington, Massachusetts and works as a statistical consultant.

Works

References

Living people
American statisticians
Women statisticians
Åbo Akademi University alumni
Uppsala University alumni
University of Wisconsin–Madison College of Letters and Science alumni
Massachusetts Institute of Technology faculty
Boston University faculty
People from Nykarleby
1941 births
American people of Finnish descent
Finnish expatriates in the United States
Finnish statisticians